Brigid Schulte is the director of the Better Life Lab at New America.

She was a staff writer for The Washington Post for nearly 17 years.

Works
 Overwhelmed: Work, Love & Play when No One has the Time. Bloomsbury, 2014,

References

External links
http://www.brigidschulte.com/
http://www.npr.org/2014/03/11/288596888/not-enough-hours-in-the-day-we-all-feel-a-little-overwhelmed

Year of birth missing (living people)
Living people
American women journalists
The Washington Post people
21st-century American women